Speakeasy is a 2002 film about two men who become unlikely friends after a minor traffic accident. Written and directed by Brendan Murphy, Speakeasy was a runner-up to become the first movie produced for Project Greenlight, a documentary series about the making of an independent film. After Pete Jones's Stolen Summer was chosen for Project Greenlight instead, the show's founders, LivePlanet and Miramax, decided to produce Speakeasy apart from the documentary series.

Cast 
 David Strathairn as Bruce Hickman
 Nicky Katt as Frank Marnikov
 Stacy Edwards as Sophie Hickman
 Arthur Hiller as Mr. Prappas
 Lake Bell as Sara Marnikov
 Christopher McDonald as Dr. Addams

Reception
Critic David Nusair gave it 2 out of 4.

See also
 List of films featuring the deaf and hard of hearing

References

External links
 
 

2002 films
2002 drama films
LivePlanet films